Hatch's Department Store is a historic U.S. building in West Palm Beach, Florida. It is located at 301-307 Clematis Street. On April 14, 1994, it was added to the U.S. National Register of Historic Places.

References

External links

 Palm Beach County listings, Florida's Office of Cultural and Historical Programs

National Register of Historic Places in Palm Beach County, Florida
Department stores on the National Register of Historic Places
Vernacular architecture in Florida
Commercial buildings on the National Register of Historic Places in Florida
Commercial buildings completed in 1903
1903 establishments in Florida